Charalampos Charalampakis (born 31 August 1980) is a Greek retired professional football defender.

Career
Charalampakis began his career at his local Alpha Ethniki side OFI. During his time with the Cretan club, Charalabakis managed to play in the 2000–01 UEFA Cup and was called up to the Greek national U−21 squad once in 2001. He left OFI to join fellow Alpha Ethniki club Egaleo, but made no appearances for the Athens-based club in the competition. He then returned to Crete to join 2nd Division side Ergotelis, with whom he celebrated promotion to the Alpha Ethniki during the 2003−04 Beta Ethniki season, as well as suffered relegation in his second season with the club.

After leaving Ergotelis in the summer of 2005, Charalabakis spent two seasons in Cyprus with AEP Paphos, before returning to Greece and join Beta Ethniki side Thrasyvoulos in 2007. He then moved to fellow Beta Ethniki side Panetolikos and returned to Thrasyvoulos in 2009.

In January 2010, Charalampakis returned to his first club OFI, where he retired his professional football career in 2011, and was hired by the club as caretaker.

References 

1980 births
Living people
Greek expatriate footballers
OFI Crete F.C. players
Egaleo F.C. players
Ergotelis F.C. players
AEP Paphos FC players
Thrasyvoulos F.C. players
Panetolikos F.C. players
Super League Greece players
Cypriot First Division players
Cypriot Second Division players
Expatriate footballers in Cyprus
Association football defenders
Footballers from Heraklion
Greek footballers